Troublesome Creek: A Midwestern is a 1995 documentary by filmmakers Jeanne Jordan and Steven Ascher. The film explores the family farm crisis through the story of Jordan's own family, as they take extraordinary measures to save their Iowa farm.

The film received the Grand Jury Prize and Audience Award for best documentary at the Sundance Film Festival, and was nominated for an Academy Award for Best Documentary Feature, among many other awards.

References

External links
Official Film Site

1995 films
American Experience
Sundance Film Festival award winners
American documentary films
Documentary films about agriculture in the United States
Documentary films about families
Films shot in Iowa
1990s English-language films
1990s American films